Milford Keresoma (born 1 February 1992 in Samoa) is a New Zealand rugby union player who represents Canterbury in the ITM Cup. Keresoma has played at under-20 and sevens levels for New Zealand and made his provincial debut for Canterbury in 2013.

References

External links
IRB profile

1992 births
Living people
New Zealand rugby union players
Rugby union wings
Canterbury rugby union players
Waikato rugby union players
New Zealand sportspeople of Samoan descent